The Asil or Aseel is an Indian breed or group of breeds of game chicken. It is distributed in much of India, particularly in the states of Tamil Nadu, Andhra Pradesh, Chhattisgarh and Odisha; it has been exported to several other countries. Similar fowl are found throughout much of Southeast Asia.

It is one of the parent breeds of the Indian Game, developed in the West Country of England in the early nineteenth century.

History 

The Asil originated in the Indian subcontinent, the area that includes modern India, Pakistan, Bangladesh and Sri Lanka; it is thought to be among the oldest breeds of fighting cock. The word "Asil" is from Arabic, and means "purebred". In India, it is a general term for all fighting breeds.

In India the Asil is distributed particularly in the Khammam district of Andhra Pradesh, in the Bastar and Dantiwara districts of Chhattisgarh, and in the Koraput and Malkanagiri districts of Odisha. It is also present in Bangladesh and Pakistan, which were part of India until Partition, and is found in other countries including Australia, Guatemala, Honduras, Ireland, Luxembourg, the United Kingdom, the United States and Uruguay.

An Asil bantam was created in the late nineteenth century by the British breeder William Flamank Entwisle; it became popular in Britain and in Holland, but later died out. In the 1980s it was re-created in Belgium by Willy Coppens, using Shamo, Indian Game and Reza Asil; it is bred in Austria, Belgium, Germany, Holland, Hungary and the United Kingdom, in a variety of colours. 

In 2005 the Asil was the only Indian breed of chicken not in need of conservation. In 2007 its global conservation status was listed by the FAO as "not at risk". In 2021 its status was reported to DAD-IS as "unknown"; the Livestock Conservancy in the United States listed it as "threatened".

Characteristics 

There are many varieties of Asil. Among them are the Amroha, Bhaingam, Kilimooku, Kulang, Lasani, Madras, Mianwali, Reza and Sindhi types.

Use 

Asil hens are not good layers, but sit well.

References

Further reading 

 Esther J.J. Verhoef-Verhallen, Aad Rijs (2003). The complete encyclopedia of chickens. Lisse: Rebo International,

Asil chicken in Pakistan 
In Pakistan, cockfighting is a well-liked sport, but the Prevention of Gambling Act of 1977 makes betting on it unlawful. However, police frequently ignore it. People in Sindh prefer to keep the trained breed known as Sindhi Aseel for this purpose, while Mianwali Aseel is another well-liked breed that has been trained for combat.

Sindh, the top supplier of fighter Asil birds and the primary location for cockfights, considers it illegal to arm the birds with either metal spurs (referred to as gaffs) or knives. Some competitions permit it in Hower Punjab, which ranks third in cockfighting after KPK.

Conservation Priority Breeds of the Livestock Conservancy
Chicken breeds originating in India
Chicken breeds originating in Pakistan
Animal breeds originating in Sindh